Isaac Hamilton Taylor (April 18, 1840 – December 18, 1936) was a lawyer, judge, and single-term U.S. Representative from Ohio from 1885 to 1887.

Biography 
Taylor was born near New Harrisburg (later Hibbetts), Carroll County, Ohio. He was the son of James and Mary Ann (Highland) Taylor. Taylor attended the common schools and completed an academic course. He then studied law and was admitted to the bar in 1867, subsequently commencing practice in Carrollton, Ohio. He served as the clerk of courts in Carroll County, Ohio from 1870 to 1877.

Taylor was elected as a Republican to the Forty-ninth Congress (March 4, 1885 – March 3, 1887). He was not a candidate for renomination in 1886.

He then moved to Canton, Ohio, and resumed the practice of law. Taylor served as a delegate to the 1892 Republican National Convention. He was the judge of the Court of Common Pleas from 1889 to 1901, when he resigned. He engaged in the practice of his profession in Canton until 1922.

Taylor died at Congress Lake, near Hartville, Ohio, December 18, 1936, and was interred in West Lawn Cemetery in Canton.

Taylor was married November 1, 1860 to Sarah J. Elder. They had three children.

References

External links 

1840 births
1936 deaths
People from Carroll County, Ohio
Politicians from Canton, Ohio
Ohio lawyers
Burials at West Lawn Cemetery
Lawyers from Canton, Ohio
People from Carrollton, Ohio
Republican Party members of the United States House of Representatives from Ohio